Thornhill is a town in Kouga Local Municipality under the Sarah Baartman District Municipality in the Eastern Cape province of South Africa.

References

Populated places in the Kouga Local Municipality